This is a listing of Australian rules footballers who made their senior debut for an Australian Football League (AFL) club in 2003.

Debuts

References

Australian rules football records and statistics
Australian rules football-related lists
2003 in Australian rules football